Skotina is a rural settlement of the former municipality of East Olympos, itself part of the municipality of Dion-Olympos, in the Pieria regional unit, Central Macedonia, Greece.

Name
The name is taken due to handmade costumes (woolen fabrics, handmade costumes), which were made in the region that made the cloaks and the sails for sailing ships of the era.

Geography
The village is built on the southeastern edge of the mount Olympus, 32 km from the city of Katerini, and has a view towards the Thermaic Gulf. Ancient places nearby are Herakleion (4 km) and Leivithra (2 km).

Population
The community of Skotina had a population 949 inhabitants as of 2011. The community consists of the settlements of Skotina, Paralia Skotinas and the nowadays uninhabited Palia Skotina.

See also
Beach of Skotina
Castle of Platamon
Platamon
Neos Panteleimonas
Palios Panteleimonas

References

Notes
Encyclopedia  Μαλλιάρης- Παιδεία, Volume 24, p. 27.

Populated places in Pieria (regional unit)
Mount Olympus